These are the Lithuanian football standings from 1971–1980.

1971

 Auksciausia Lyga
 
  1 Pazanga Vilnius           30 17  9  4  48- 21  27  43
  2 Granitas Klaipeda         30 15  9  6  42- 22  20  39
  3 Vienybe Ukmerge           30 14 10  6  44- 19  25  38
  4 Minija Kretinga           30 13  8  9  40- 33   7  34
  5 Atletas Kaunas            30 11 11  8  25- 19   6  33
  6 Inkaras Kaunas            30 10 12  8  30- 21   9  32
  7 Dainava Alytus            30 10 11  9  29- 29   0  31
  8 Statyba Panevezys         30 11  7 12  38- 32   6  29
  9 Statybininkas Siauliai    30  9 11 10  22- 29  -7  29
 10 Nevezis Kedainiai         30  8 12 10  25- 29  -4  28
 11 Banga Kaunas              30  8 11 11  26- 33  -7  27
 12 Ekranas Panevezys         30  6 14 10  26- 36 -10  26
 13 Chemikas Kedainiai        30  9  8 13  27- 43 -16  26
 14 Politechnika Kaunas       30  9  7 14  37- 45  -8  25
 15 Drobe Kaunas              30  5 11 14  23- 38 -15  21
 16 Inzinerija Vilnius        30  5  9 16  23- 56 -33  19
 
 
 Win in Group A Zalgiris: Tauras Siauliai
 Win in Group A Nemunas: Suduva Kapsukas
  
   CUP
  
 Semifinal
   Pazanga Vilnius - Dainava Alytus  2:1
   Statyba Panevezys - Elektra Mazeikiai  4:0
  
 Final
   Pazanga Vilnius - Statyba Panevezys  1:0  3:1

1972

 Auksciausia Lyga
 
  1 Nevezis Kedainiai         28 16  7  5  45- 26  19  39
  2 Pazanga Vilnius           28 17  4  7  55- 30  25  38
  3 Dainava Alytus            28 14  7  7  35- 19  16  35
  4 Atletas Kaunas            28 12  8  8  34- 24  10  32
  5 Banga Kaunas              28 12  8  8  34- 30   4  32
  6 Statyba Panevezys         28 11  9  8  30- 33  -3  31
  7 Vienybe Ukmerge           28 11  8  9  33- 26   7  30
  8 Tauras Siauliai           28  9 12  7  30- 31  -1  30
  9 Statybininkas Siauliai    28  8 12  8  26- 25   1  28
 10 Inkaras Kaunas            28 10  7 11  27- 30  -3  27
 11 Suduva Kapsukas           28  9  7 12  32- 36  -4  25
 12 Granitas Klaipeda         28  8  8 12  35- 35   0  24
 13 Ekranas Panevezys         28  5 11 12  29- 42 -13  21
 14 Politechnika Kaunas       28  5  6 17  18- 38 -20  16
 15 Minija Kretinga           28  3  6 19  17- 55 -38  12
 
 
 Win in Group A Zalgiris: Elnias Siauliai
 Win in Group A Nemunas: Chemikas Kedainiai
 
   CUP
 
 Semifinal
   Nevezis Kedainiai - Atmosfera Panevezys  7:1
   Ekranas Panevezys - Statybininkas Siauliai  2:  
  
 Final
   Nevezis Kedainiai - Ekranas Panevezys  1:1  3:2

1973

 Auksciausia Lyga             
 
 Group Zalgiris
 
  1 Pazanga Vilnius           26 17  5  4  45- 18  27  39
  2 Granitas Klaipeda         26 16  3  7  47- 17  30  35
  3 Atletas Kaunas            26 14  5  7  36- 17  19  33
  4 Ekranas Panevezys         26 14  3  9  36- 28   8  31
  5 Elektronika Vilnius       26 10  8  8  24- 26  -2  28
  6 Banga Kaunas              26  8 11  7  30- 24   6  27
  7 Tauras Siauliai           26 10  7  9  33- 28   5  27
  8 Statyba Panevezys         26 10  7  9  28- 34  -6  27
  9 Statybininkas Siauliai    26  8  7 11  19- 21  -2  23
 10 Politechnika Kaunas       26  9  5 12  21- 34 -13  23
 11 Inkaras Kaunas            26  6 10 10  23- 31  -8  22
 12 Zalgiris N. Vilnia        26  7  7 12  24- 36 -12  21
 13 KKI Kaunas                26  6  5 15  21- 36 -15  17
 14 Automobilininkas Klapeda  26  1  9 16  19- 56 -37  11
   
 Group Nemunas
 
  1 Nevezis Kedainiai         22 17  3  2  66- 25  41  37
  2 Dainava Alytus            22 14  6  2  48- 19  29  34
  3 Suduva Kapsukas           22 14  5  3  39- 17  22  33
  4 Vienybe Ukmerge           22  9  9  4  39- 18  21  27
  5 Atmosfera Mazeikiai       22  8  6  8  25- 24   1  22
  6 Chemikas Kedainiai        22  8  5  9  31- 29   2  21
  7 Tauras Taurage            22  7  5 10  29- 38  -9  19
  8 Cementas N. Akmene        22  6  5 11  23- 43 -20  17
  9 Minija Kretinga           22  5  6 11  27- 37 -10  16
 10 Kooperatininkas Plunge    22  5  5 12  29- 45 -16  15
 11 Sveikata Kybartai         22  5  3 14  28- 58 -30  13
 12 Mastis Telsiai            22  4  2 16  29- 60 -31  10
  
 Final
 
  1 Nevezis Kedainiai         10  5  2  3  16- 10   6  12
  2 Granitas Klaipeda         10  5  2  3  11-  7   4  12
  3 Dainava Alytus            10  3  5  2   9-  7   2  11
  4 Atletas Kaunas            10  5  1  4   9-  9   0  11
  5 Pazanga Vilnius           10  4  2  4   5-  9  -4  10
  6 Suduva Kapsukas           10  1  2  7   6- 14  -8   4
 
 Final Game
 
   Nevezis Kedainiai - Granitas Klaipeda  3:0
 
 
  7 Vienybe Ukmerge - Ekranas Panevezys  1:2  4:0
  9 Atmosfera Mazeikiai - Elektronika Vilnius  4:2  2:1
 11 Banga Kaunas - Chemikas Kedainiai  3:0  1:0
 13 Tauras Siauliai - Tauras Taurage  1:1  2:0
 15 Statyba Panevezys - Cementas N. Akmene  1:2  3:1
 17 Statybininkas Siauliai - Minija Kretinga  2:1  1:0
 19 Politechnika Kaunas - Kooperatininkas Plunge  0:0  3:1
 21 Sveikata Kybartai - Inkaras Kaunas  1:0  1:1
 23 Zalgiris N. Vilnia - Mastis Telsiai  3:1  5:2
 25 KKI Kaunas
 26 Automobilininkas Klaipeda
 
 
 Win in Group A Zalgiris: Ausra Vilnius 
 Win in Group A Nemunas: Utenis Utena
  
   CUP
  
 Semifinal
   Nevezis Kedainiai - Statyba Panevezys  2:0
   Pazanga Vilnius - Vienybe Ukmerge  0:0 (5-4)
  
 Final
   Nevezis Kedainiai - Pazanga Vilnius  1:0

1974

 Auksciausia Lyga
 
 Group Zalgiris
  
  1 Tauras Siauliai           24 16  5  3  49- 15  34  37
  2 Pazanga Vilnius           24 12  7  5  35- 21  14  31
  3 Statybininkas Siauliai    24 11  8  5  38- 18  20  30
  4 Ekranas Panevezys         24 11  8  5  27- 18   9  30
  5 Atletas Kaunas            24 11  6  7  28- 20   8  28
  6 Banga Kaunas              24 10  6  8  30- 21   9  26
  7 Ausra Vilnius             24  7  9  8  23- 22   1  23
  8 Statyba Panevezys         24  5 12  7  15- 22  -7  22
  9 Elektronika Vilnius       24  7  7 10  15- 27 -12  21
 10 Inkaras Kaunas            24  6  9  9  13- 25 -12  21
 11 Sviesa Vilnius            24  5  6 13  21- 34 -13  16
 12 Politechnika Kaunas       24  6  3 15  17- 43 -26  15
 13 Granitas Klaipeda         24  3  6 15  14- 39 -25  12
  
 Group Nemunas
  
  1 Vienybe Ukmerge           22 16  3  3  69- 17  52  35
  2 Atmosfera Mazeikiai       22 16  3  3  53- 11  42  35
  3 Dainava Alytus            22 15  4  3  44- 11  33  34
  4 Nevezis Kedainiai         22 16  1  5  39- 19  20  33
  5 Suduva Kapsukas           22 12  4  6  29- 16  13  28
  6 Sveikata Kybartai         22 10  0 12  20- 35 -15  20
  7 Kooperatininkas Plunge    22  6  7  9  29- 38  -9  19
  8 Chemikas Kedainiai        22  5  5 12  23- 30  -7  15
  9 Cementas N. Akmene        22  5  4 13  17- 47 -30  14
 10 Minija Kretinga           22  5  3 14  21- 46 -25  13
 11 Tauras Taurage            22  4  3 15  25- 66 -41  11
 12 Utenis Utena              22  3  1 18  19- 52 -33   7
 
 Final
 
  1 Tauras Siauliai           10  7  2  1  19-  6  13  16 
  2 Vienybe Ukmerge           10  6  2  2  16- 10   6  14
  3 Atmosfera Mazeikiai       10  4  2  4  17- 13   4  10
  4 Dainava Alytus            10  2  4  4  11- 17  -6   8
  5 Statybininkas Siauliai    10  2  3  5  11- 19  -8   7
  6 Pazanga Vilnius           10  1  3  6   9- 18  -9   5
 
 
  7 Ekranas Panevezys - Nevezis Kedainiai  1:1  3:3 (8-6)
  9 Suduva Kapsukas - Atletas Kaunas  1:0  0:0
 11 Banga Kaunas - Sveikata Kybartai  3:0  0:0
 13 Ausra Vilnius - Kooperatininkas Plunge  2:3  1:0 (3-2)
 15 Chemikas Kedainiai - Statyba Panevezys  0:1  2:0
 17 Cementas N. Akmene - Elektronika Vilnius  2:1  1:2 (5-4)
 19 Minija Kretinga - Inkaras Kaunas  4:2  +:- 
 21 Tauras Taurage - Sviesa Vilnius  +:-
 23 Politechnika Kaunas - Utenis Utena  4:0  +:-
 25 Granitas Klaipeda
 
 
 Win in Group A Zalgiris: Inzinierija Vilnius, Kelininkas Kaunas, Baltija
 Klaipeda
 Win in Group A Nemunas: Banga Gargzdai
 
   CUP 
  
 Semifinal 
   Kelininkas Kaunas - Suduva Kapsukas  1:0
   Statybininkas Siauliai - Vienybe Ukmerge  3:2  
  
 Final
   Statybininkas Siauliai - Kelininkas Kaunas  2:1

1975

 Auksciausia Lyga
 
 Group Zalgiris
  
  1 Tauras Siauliai           26 14  9  3  34- 16  18  37
  2 Ekranas Panevezys         26 14  7  5  33- 24   9  35
  3 Pazanga Vilnius           26 10 14  2  31- 16  15  34
  4 Atletas Kaunas            26 13  7  6  37- 18  19  33
  5 Kelininkas Kaunas         26 11  9  6  37- 26  11  31
  6 Politechnika Kaunas       26 12  6  8  36- 29   7  30
  7 Statybininkas Siauliai    26  9 10  7  33- 24   9  28
  8 Granitas Klaipeda         26 11  6  9  31- 29   2  28
  9 Sviesa Vilnius            26  8  8 10  25- 28  -3  24
 10 Ausra Vilnius             26  7  9 10  30- 40 -10  23
 11 Inkaras Kaunas            26  7  5 14  17- 29 -12  19
 12 Statyba Panevezys         26  5  9 12  20- 39 -19  19
 13 Banga Kaunas              26  3  7 16  12- 34 -22  13
 14 Elektronika Vilnius       26  3  4 19  12- 36 -24  10
 
 Group Nemunas
 
  1 Dainava Alytus            22 17  3  2  50- 12  38  37 
  2 Suduva Kapsukas           22 15  5  2  52- 14  38  35
  3 Nevezis Kedainiai         22 16  3  3  52- 18  34  35
  4 Kooperatininkas Plunge    22 12  4  6  38- 21  17  28
  5 Vienybe Ukmerge           22 10  7  5  44- 23  21  27
  6 Atmosfera Mazeikiai       22  8  7  7  34- 25   9  23
  7 Chemikas Kedainiai        22  8  4 10  35- 41  -6  20
  8 Tauras Taurage            22  8  2 12  32- 57 -25  18
  9 Sveikata Kybartai         22  6  3 13  29- 45 -16  15
 10 Cementas N. Akmene        22  6  1 15  23- 44 -21  13
 11 Banga Gargzdai            22  4  1 17  15- 60 -45   9
 12 Minija Kretinga           22  1  2 19   9- 53 -44   4 
 
 Final
 
  1 Dainava Alytus            10  6  4  0  12-  3   9  16
  2 Pazanga Vilnius           10  4  3  3  12-  7   5  11
  3 Suduva Kapsukas           10  5  1  4  15- 10   5  11
  4 Tauras Siauliai           10  3  4  3   7-  7   0  10
  5 Nevezis Kedainiai         10  1  4  5   8- 16  -8   6
  6 Ekranas Panevezys         10  2  2  6   7- 18 -11   6 
 
 
  7 Atlatas Kaunas - Kooperatininkas Plunge  2:3  2:0
  9 Vienybe Ukmerge - Kelininkas Kaunas  1:0  2:1
 11 Politechnika Kaunas - Atmosfera Mazeikiai  3:0  3:4
 13 Statybininkas Siauliai - Chemikas Kedainiai  0:0  2:0
 15 Granitas Klaipeda - Tauras Taurage  2:1  +:-
 17 Sviesa Vilnius - Sveikata Kybartai  +:-  
 19 Ausra Vilnius - Cementas N.Akmene  1:2  2:1  (5-4)
 21 Inkaras Kaunas - Banga Gargzdai  3:1  0:1
 23 Statyba Panevezys - Minija Kretinga  4:0  0:3   
 25 Banga Kaunas
 26 Elektronika Vilnius
 
 Win in Group A Zalgiris: Elektronas Vilnius, Pluostas Kaunas, Baltija Klaipeda,
                          Atmosfera Panevezys
 Win in Group A Nemunas: Impulsas Telsiai, Banga Alytus, Pamarys Silute, Utenis
                         Utena 
  
   CUP
  
 Semifinal
   Vienybe Ukmerge - Kooperatininkas Plunge  2:0
   Statybininkas Siauliai - Atmosfera Mazekiai  2:0
  
 Final
   Vienybe Ukmerge - Statybininkas Siauliai  3:0

1976

 Auksciausia Lyga             
 
 Group Zalgiris
 
  1 Ausra Vilnius             13  9  2  2  20-  8  12  20
  2 Kelininkas Kaunas         13  8  3  2  22-  8  14  19 
  3 Pazanga Vilnius           13  7  3  3  16-  8   8  17
  4 Tauras Siauliai           13  6  5  2  23- 15   8  17
  5 Statybininkas Siauliai    13  6  3  4  16-  9   7  15
  6 Granitas Klaipeda         13  6  2  5  19- 11   8  14
  7 Statyba Panevezys         13  5  2  6  14- 15  -1  12
  8 Sviesa Vilnius            13  3  6  4  13- 14  -1  12
  9 Atletas Kaunas            13  3  5  5  12- 18  -6  11
 10 Inkaras Kaunas            13  3  5  5  11- 18  -7  11
 11 Banga Kaunas              13  3  4  6   5- 10  -5  10
 12 Ekranas Panevezys         13  4  1  8  12- 25 -13   9
 13 Elektronas Vilnius        13  3  2  8  11- 21 -10   8 
 14 Politechnika Kaunas       13  3  1  9   9- 23 -14   7
 
 Group Nemunas
  
  1 Vienybe Ukmerge           11  8  3  0  22-  5  17  19
  2 Dainava Alytus            11  8  2  1  25-  9  16  18
  3 Atmosfera Mazeikiai       11  7  3  1  26-  5  21  17
  4 Nevezis Kedainiai         11  6  3  2  17-  4  13  15
  5 Suduva Kapsukas           11  5  3  3  23-  9  14  13
  6 Sveikata Kybartai         11  5  1  5  12-  7   5  11
  7 Tauras Taurage            11  3  3  5   9- 16  -7   9
  8 Cementas N. Akmene        11  3  3  5   7- 23 -16   9
  9 Kooperatininkas Plunge    11  2  2  7  11- 29 -18   6
 10 Minija Kretinga           11  2  2  7   6- 16 -10   6
 11 Banga Gargzdai            11  2  1  8   7- 21 -14   5
 12 Impulsas Telsiai          11  1  2  8   5- 26 -21   4
 
 Final
 
  1 Atmosfera Mazeikiai       14  8  3  3  27- 14  13  19
  2 Vienybe Ukmerge           14  7  3  4  20- 15   5  17
  3 Pazanga Vilnius           14  7  3  4  15- 17  -2  17
  4 Dainava Alytus            14  6  4  4  17- 12   5  16
  5 Kelininkas Kaunas         14  7  1  6  21- 14   7  15
  6 Nevezis Kedainiai         14  6  3  5  24- 17   7  15
  7 Tauras Siauliai           14  4  4  6  19- 25  -6  12
  8 Ausra Vilnius             14  0  1 13   6- 35 -29   1
  
   
 Group Zalgiris
 
  9 Statybininkas Siauliai    22 12  4  6  32- 17  15  28
 11 Granitas Klaipeda         22 10  6  6  31- 16  15  26
 13 Inkaras Kaunas            22  9  6  7  28- 28   0  24
 15 Atletas Kaunas            22  8  8  6  25- 26  -1  24
 17 Statyba Panevezys         22  8  3 11  31- 31   0  19
 19 Sviesa Vilnius            22  5  9  8  22- 25  -3  19
 21 Banga Kaunas              22  7  5 10  16- 20  -4  19
 23 Ekranas Panevezys         22  6  4 12  20- 42 -22  16
 25 Elektronas Vilnius        22  5  3 14  17- 35 -18  13
 26 Politechnika Kaunas       22  4  3 15  21- 45 -24  11
 
 Group Nemunas 
 
  9 Suduva Kapsukas           25 12  5  8  47- 22  25  29
 11 Sveikata Kybartai         25 11  4 10  33- 26   7  26 
 13 Tauras Taurage            25 10  6  9  36- 38  -2  26
 15 Cementas N. Akmene        25  7  7 11  19- 43 -24  21
 17 Banga Gargzdai            25  9  2 14  27- 38 -11  20
 19 Impulsas Telsiai          25  7  6 12  32- 46 -14  20
 21 Minija Kretinga           25  6  6 13  21- 40 -19  18
 23 Kooperatininkas Plunge    25  5  5 15  30- 59 -29  15
  
 
 
 Win in Group A Zalgiris: Kibirkstis Vilnius, Pilenai Kaunas, Sirijus Klaipeda,
                          Elnias Siauliai, KN Panevezys
 Win in Group A Nemunas: Automobilininkas Jonava, Tarybu Lietuva Kalvarija, 
                         Montuotojas Mazeikiai, Lokomotyvas Radviliskis
 
  
   CUP
  
 Semifinal
   Kelininkas Kaunas - Tauras Siauliai  2:1
   Suduva Kapsukas - Statybininkas Siauliai  1:0  
  
 Final
   Kelininkas Kaunas - Suduva Kapsukas  2:1

1977

 Auksciausia Lyga
 
 Group Zalgiris
  
  1 Kelininkas Kaunas         14  8  6  0  34-  9  25  22
  2 Statybininkas Siauliai    14  7  6  1  19-  8  11  20
  3 Tauras Siauliai           14  8  4  2  20- 11   9  20
  4 Banga Kaunas              14  7  6  1  18- 12   6  20
  5 Sviesa Vilnius            14  7  5  2  17-  8   9  19
  6 Granitas Klaipeda         14  6  6  2  20-  9  11  18
  7 Atletas Kaunas            14  7  2  5  20- 20   0  16
  8 Inkaras Kaunas            14  5  5  4  15- 14   1  15
  9 Pazanga Vilnius           14  4  5  5  14- 14   0  13
 10 Statyba Panevezys         14  4  2  8  24- 27  -3  10
 11 Ausra Vilnius             14  2  6  6  10- 16  -6  10
 12 Politechnika Kaunas       14  1  8  5   8- 17  -9  10
 13 Ekranas Panevezys         14  0  8  6   9- 21 -12   8
 14 Kibirkstis Vilnius        14  1  3 10   7- 34 -27   5
 15 Zvejas Klaipeda           14  1  2 11   7- 22 -15   4
 
 Group Nemunas
 
  1 Vienybe Ukmerge           11 10  1  0  37-  7  30  21
  2 Atmosfera Mazeikiai       11  8  3  0  22-  3  19  19
  3 Nevezis Kedainiai         11  8  2  1  26-  4  22  18
  4 Dainava Alytus            11  7  2  2  21-  5  16  16
  5 Suduva Kapsukas           11  5  2  4  19- 10   9  12
  6 Kooperatininkas Plunge    11  5  2  4  20- 16   4  12
  7 Sveikata Kybartai         11  4  1  6  17- 27 -10   9
  8 Automobilininkas Jonava   11  4  0  7  12- 40 -28   8
  9 Minija Kretinga           11  3  1  7  14- 26 -12   7
 10 Impulsas Telsiai          11  2  0  9  12- 25 -13   4
 11 Tauras Taurage            11  1  2  8  10- 25 -15   4
 12 Banga Gargzdai            11  0  2  9   3- 25 -22   2
 
 Final
  
  1 Statybininkas Siauliai    14  9  3  2  17- 10   7  21
  2 Kelininkas Kaunas         14  7  4  3  26-  9  17  18
  3 Atmosfera Mazeikiai       14  7  4  3  19- 15   4  18
  4 Dainava Alytus            14  7  3  4  19- 12   7  17
  5 Nevezis Kedainiai         14  6  2  6  18- 14   4  14
  6 Vienybe Ukmerge           14  6  1  7  28- 24   4  13
  7 Tauras Siauliai           14  3  0 11  17- 35 -18   6
  8 Banga Kaunas              14  2  1 11   7- 32 -25   5
   
  
 Group Zalgiris
   
  9 Granitas Klaipeda         24 12 10  2  32- 14  18  34
 11 Sviesa Vilnius            24 13  7  4  31- 13  18  33
 13 Atletas Kaunas            24 13  5  6  39- 30   9  31
 15 Pazanga Vilnius           24 10  8  6  27- 19   8  28
 17 Politechnika Kaunas       24  7 11  6  19- 23  -4  25
 19 Inkaras Kaunas            24  8  6 10  24- 34 -10  22
 21 Statyba Panevezys         24  8  4 12  42- 40   2  20
 23 Ausra Vilnius             24  3  9 12  14- 26 -12  15
 25 Ekranas Panevezys         24  2 10 12  18- 39 -21  14
 26 Kibirkstis Vilnius        24  2  5 17  13- 48 -35   9
 27 Zvejas Klaipeda           24  1  5 18  13- 37 -24   7
  
 Group Nemunas
  
  9 Suduva Kapsukas           25 15  6  4  59- 22  37  36
 11 Kooperatininkas Plunge    25 12  5  8  45- 36   9  29
 13 Minija Kretinga           25 10  4 11  35- 47 -12  24
 15 Sveikata Kybartai         25  8  5 12  38- 43  -5  21
 17 Automobilininkas Jonava   25  8  3 14  27- 62 -35  19
 19 Impulsas Telsiai          25  6  2 17  35- 52 -17  14
 21 Tauras Taurage            25  5  4 16  31- 59 -28  14
 23 Banga Gargzdai            25  5  3 17  19- 52 -33  13
 
 
 Win in Group A Zalgiris: Maistas Kaunas, Zalgiris N.Vilnia, Syrius Klaipeda,
                          Elnias Siauliai, ISM Panevezys
 Win in Group A Nemunas: Utenis Utena, Tarybu Lietuva Kalvarija, Mituva
                         Jurbarkas, Keramikas Daugeliai
 
 
   CUP
  
 Semifinal
   Kelininkas Kaunas - Pazanga Vilnius  3:2
   Granitas Klaipeda - Utenis Utena  1:0
  
 Final
   Granitas Klaipeda - Kelininkas Kaunas  2:0

1978

 Auksciausia Lyga
 
  1 Granitas Klaipeda         30 15 12  3  45- 19  26  42
  2 Statybininkas Siauliai    30 14 11  5  31- 16  15  39
  3 Banga Kaunas              30 15  8  7  43- 26  17  38
  4 Kelininkas Kaunas         30 14  9  7  41- 19  22  37
  5 Atmosfera Mazeikiai       30 13  9  8  33- 21  12  35
  6 Tauras Siauliai           30 13  6 11  30- 28   2  32
  7 Sviesa Vilnius            30  8 14  8  27- 25   2  30
  8 Politechnika Kaunas       30  9 11 10  32- 32   0  29
  9 Pazanga Vilnius           30  8 12 10  30- 31  -1  28
 10 Dainava Alytus            30 10  8 12  33- 39  -6  28
 11 Kooperatininkas Plunge    30 11  5 14  32- 44 -12  27
 12 Nevezis Kedainiai         30  7 12 11  32- 36  -4  26
 13 Ekranas Panevezys         30  7 10 13  33- 41  -8  24
 14 Vienybe Ukmerge           30  9  6 15  33- 47 -14  24
 15 Atletas Kaunas            30  8  7 15  33- 51 -18  23
 16 Suduva Kapsukas           30  4 10 16  18- 51 -33  18
 
 
 
 Win in Group A Zalgiris: Ausra Vilnius
 Win in Group A Nemunas: Utenis Utena
 
 
   CUP
  
 Semifinal
   Kelininkas Kaunas - Statyba Jonava  3:1
   Kooperatininkas Plunge - Politechnika Kaunas  2:1
 
 Final
   Kelininkas Kaunas - Kooperatininkas Plunge  2:0

1979

 Auksciausia Lyga
 
  1 Atmosfera Mazeikiai       32 22  6  4  46- 15  31  50
  2 Kelininkas Kaunas         32 20  9  3  74- 35  39  49
  3 Nevezis Kedainiai         32 15 10  7  49- 28  21  40
  4 Tauras Siauliai           32 15  8  9  47- 32  15  38
  5 Statybininkas Siauliai    32 13 11  8  37- 23  14  37
  6 Atletas Kaunas            32 11 13  8  33- 28   5  35
  7 Dainava Alytus            32 12 10 10  39- 38   1  34
  8 Politechnika Kaunas       32 11 10 11  43- 42   1  32
  9 Pazanga Vilnius           32 10 11 11  38- 38   0  31
 10 Vienybe Ukmerge           32 10 11 11  30- 34  -4  31
 11 Granitas Klaipeda         32  9  9 14  43- 43   0  27
 12 Utenis Utena              32  9  9 14  35- 45 -10  27
 13 Ausra Vilnius             32  9  9 14  22- 33 -11  27
 14 Banga Kaunas              32  9  9 14  29- 46 -17  27
 15 Ekranas Panevezys         32  6 10 16  29- 56 -27  22
 16 Sviesa Vilnius            32  7  7 18  33- 52 -19  21
 17 Kooperatininkas Plunge    32  5  6 21  30- 69 -39  16
 
 
 Win in Group A Zalgiris: Suduva Kapsukas  
 Win in Group A Nemunas: Statyba Jonava 
  
  
   CUP
  
 Semifinal 
   Kelininkas Kaunas - Pazanga Vilnius  3:0 
   Atmosfera Mazeikiai - Vienybe Ukmerge  2:0
 
 Final
   Kelininkas Kaunas - Atmosfera Mazeikiai  1:0

1980

 Auksciausia lyga
 
  1 Granitas Klaipeda         34 20 10  4  67- 31  36  50
  2 Tauras Siauliai           34 19 10  5  48- 21  27  48
  3 Politechnika Kaunas       34 18 10  6  36- 21  15  46
  4 Atmosfera Mazeikiai       34 16 11  7  39- 24  15  43
  5 Kelininkas Kaunas         34 14 12  8  49- 36  13  40
  6 Statybininkas Siauliai    34 12 14  8  41- 28  13  38
  7 Pazanga Vilnius           34 14  7 13  39- 31   8  35
  8 Nevezis Kedainiai         34 11 10 13  42- 44  -2  32
  9 Utenis Utena              34 11  9 14  39- 35   4  31
 10 Jaunimas Vilnius          34  9 13 12  40- 42  -2  31
 11 Statyba Jonava            34 12  7 15  44- 48  -4  31
 12 Ekranas Panevezys         34 12  7 15  36- 43  -7  31
 13 Dainava Alytus            34  9 12 13  37- 46  -9  30
 14 Vienybe Ukmerge           34  7 13 14  38- 52 -14  27
 15 Atletas Kaunas            34  7 12 15  32- 44 -12  26
 16 Banga Kaunas              34  7 12 15  31- 49 -18  26
 17 Ausra Vilnius             34 10  5 19  28- 53 -25  25
 18 Suduva Kapsukas           34  7  8 19  34- 72 -38  22
 
 Promotion
   Inkaras Kaunas         
   Sviesa Vilnius
   Sveikata Kybartai
  
  
 CUP
  
 Semifinal
   Kelininkas Kaunas - Nevezis Kedainiai  3:1
   Banga Kaunas - Granitas Klaipeda  2:0
 
 Final
   Kelininkas Kaunas - Banga Kaunas  3:1

Sources
RSSF/Almantas Lahzadis

Football in Lithuania